Titus Lowe (17 December 1877 – November 1959) was an English-American Bishop of the Methodist Episcopal Church and The Methodist Church, elected in 1924.

Birth and family
Titus Lowe was born  in Bilston, England, the son of William Henry and Anna (Scribbins) Lowe, and came to America in 1892, at the age of 14, with his mother and sisters Annie, Louisa, and Mary. His father and older brothers, Thomas and George, had come to America in 1890, where they lived in Pittsburgh, Pennsylvania and worked in the area's steel mills.  Lowe married Anna Bessie Creed (b. 1880) on October 18, 1901.  They had two daughters, Madelyn Bessie Lowe and Evelyn Oldham Lowe, and a son who died in infancy.  Anna died in 1911. Lowe married Edith Eglantine Egloff (b. 1876) on January 6, 1913 and had one daughter, Anna Jane Lowe, by that marriage. After Edith's death in 1955, Lowe married Ellen Louise Stoy (1890-1979) on January 8, 1957.

Education
Lowe graduated from Ohio Wesleyan University, earning the B.A. degree in 1900 and the M.A. in 1908.  He attended the Western Theological Seminary (now Pittsburgh Theological Seminary), 1900-02. He was a member of the Sigma Chi fraternity.  He also received several honorary doctorates.

Ordained ministry and missionary service
The Rev. Titus Lowe entered the Pittsburgh Annual Conference of the M.E. Church in 1900. He was appointed  pastor of the Fourth Street Methodist Church, Braddock, Pennsylvania, serving 1900-03.  He then went as a missionary to India, pastoring the Thoburn Methodist Church in Calcutta, 1903-08.

Lowe returned to the United States in 1908 and was appointed pastor in South Fork, Pennsylvania (1908–09).  Then he was appointed, in succession, to the First Methodist Churches of Cedar Falls, Iowa (1909–13) and Omaha, Nebraska (1913–21).  In 1921 the Rev. Dr. Lowe was elected Corresponding Secretary of the Board of Foreign Missions of the M.E. Church, serving in this position until elected to the episcopacy.

The Rev. Lowe also served as a lecturer under the auspices of the International Committee of the YMCA in France during World War I (1917–18).  He was elected a delegate to M.E. General Conferences (1916–24).

Episcopal ministry
Lowe was elected to the episcopacy of the Methodist Episcopal Church by the 1924 General Conference.  He was assigned to the Singapore episcopal area (1924–28).  He was then assigned to the Portland Episcopal Area (1928–39), and to the Indianapolis Episcopal Area of The Methodist Church in 1939.  His offices were located at 305 Underwriters Bldg. in Indianapolis.

Bishop Lowe's accomplishments were many while Episcopal Leader in Indiana.  Among these include being a charter member of the World Service Commission of the Methodist Church; serving as President of the Methodist Commission on Interdenominational Relations; as President of the Methodist Hospital of Indianapolis, and as President of the Methodist Council of Bishops.

Honors
Rev. Lowe was honored with the D.D. degree (1916) and the LL.D. degree (1926) by the Nebraska Wesleyan University.  Ohio Wesleyan gave him the D.D. in 1920.  The College of Puget Sound honored him with the L.H.D. in 1931.

Bishop Lowe was a 33rd degree Mason.  He was also named a Significant Sig by the national Sigma Chi Fraternity.

Retirement and death
Lowe retired from the episcopacy in 1948, and was appointed Executive Secretary of the Methodist Commission on Overseas Relief for five years. He lived in Indianapolis until his death in November 1959.

See also
List of bishops of the United Methodist Church

References
 Howell, Clinton T., Prominent Personalities in American Methodism, Birmingham, Alabama:  The Lowry Press, 1945.
 Bishop Titus Lowe Papers, M997.004, M999.025, Archives of DePauw University and Indiana United Methodism, Archives and Special Collections, DePauw University Libraries. 
 Genealogical information about Titus Lowe from rootsweb.com (accessed 5 February 2007)

Notes

External links
 Significant Sigs

1877 births
1959 deaths
Ohio Wesleyan University alumni
American Methodist bishops
Bishops of the Methodist Episcopal Church
American people of World War I
American expatriates in Singapore
Methodist missionaries in India
American expatriates in India
Methodist missionaries in Singapore
Methodist missionaries in the United States
American Methodist missionaries
People from Bilston
English emigrants to the United States
20th-century Methodist bishops
People from Cedar Falls, Iowa
Pittsburgh Theological Seminary alumni